Anaheterotis pobeguinii is an herb of the family Melastomataceae, in the monospecific genus Anaheterotis. Its species name is an homage to French explorer Charles-Henri Pobéguin

Range 
It is distributed in tropical West Africa; endemic to the Woodland savanna of Guinea and Sierra Leone. It grows along rivers at an altitude of 1200–1400 meters.

Description 
It is an erect, unbranched herb, with a pale, simple stem but well-branched terminal inflorescence. The flowers are purple to red. It grows up to 60 cm tall. The plant is a geophyte, growing from a tuberous rootstock.

References

External links 

 
 

Melastomataceae
Melastomataceae genera
Monotypic Myrtales genera